Baranovka is a rural locality (a selo) and the administrative center of Baranovsky Selsoviet, Zmeinogorsky District, Altai Krai, Russia. The population was 1,917 as of 2013. There are 10 streets.

Geography 
Baranovka is located 13 km south of Zmeinogorsk (the district's administrative centre) by road. Galtsovka is the nearest rural locality.

References 

Rural localities in Zmeinogorsky District